Alfonso Grosso Ramos (1928-1995) was a Spanish writer. He won the Premio de la Crítica for his novel Guarnición de Silla (1970) and the Premio Alfaguara for his autobiographical novel Florido mayo (1973).

Selected filmography
 Goya, a Story of Solitude (1971)

References

1928 births
1995 deaths
Spanish male writers
International Writing Program alumni